The following page lists power stations in South Korea.

Non-renewable

Coal 
All power station lists are based on the 7th Basic Electricity Supply Plan(2015)

Fuel Oil 
All power stations with at least 500 MW nameplate capacity are listed.

Natural Gas 
All power stations with at least 1,000 MW nameplate capacity are listed.

Nuclear 
All power stations are listed.

Renewable

Hydroelectric 
Power stations with at least 50 MW nameplate capacity are listed.

Tidal

Wind 
Power stations with at least 10 MW nameplate capacity are listed.

See also 
 List of largest power stations in the world

References 

South Korea
 
Power stations